Robert Clarke (1920–2005) was an American actor.

Robert, Rob, Bob, Bobby, or Bobbie Clarke may also refer to:

Arts and entertainment
Bob Clarke (illustrator) (1926–2013), American illustrator for Mad magazine
Bobbie Clarke (born Robert William Woodman, 1941–2014), English rock drummer
Bob Carlos Clarke (1950–2006), Irish photographer
Rob Clarke (musician), English musician

Politics and law
Sir Robert Clarke, 2nd Baronet (1683–1746), British politician and lawyer
Robert G. Clark Jr. (born 1928), African-American politician in Mississippi House of Representatives
Rob Clarke (born 1967), Canadian politician and Royal Canadian Mounted Police officer

Sports
Bob Clarke (baseball) (1903–1971), American Negro leagues baseball player
Robert Clarke (cricketer) (1924–1981), English cricketer
Bobby Clarke (footballer) (1941–2008), English footballer for Chester City and Witton Albion
Bobby Clarke (born 1949), Canadian hockey player
Robert Clarke (footballer) (born 1967), Liberian footballer

Others
Robert Clarke (Dean of Tuam) (1717–1782), Irish Anglican priest
Robert Clarke (inventor) (1816–1882), English inventor of the pennywhistle and manufacturer of tin whistles
Robert Clarke (architect) (1819–1877), architect in Nottingham
Robert Charles Clarke (1843–1904), architect in Nottingham
Robert L. Clarke (born 1942), Comptroller of the Currency of the United States
Robert Connell Clarke (born 1953), ethnobotanist specialist in cannabis evolution
Bob Clarke (historian) (born 1964), English archaeologist and historian
Robert Clarke (academic), Irish oncology researcher

Other uses
Robert Clarke & Company, publisher and bookseller in Cincinnati, Ohio
Bob Clarke Trophy, annual award given by Western Hockey League
Bobby Clarke Trophy, annual award given by Philadelphia Flyers hockey team

See also
Robert Clark (disambiguation)
Robert Clerk (disambiguation)
Clarke (surname)